Portrait of a Lady in a Red Dress is a painting by Dutch artist Gabriël Metsu, created c. 1660-1669. It has been in England since 1828 and in the collection of Polesden Lacey since 1922.

The motif of a figure presented in a "niche" follows a style made popular by Metsu's teacher, Gerrit Dou. The central figure is a black woman dressed in a similar red bodice worn by Metsu's wife Isabella de Wolff in a portrait he painted soon after he married her in Enkhuizen in 1658. Like other contemporary Leiden fijnschilders, Metsu has chosen the subject of a niche or window to frame his subject. The popular motif generally includes a curtain for a dramatic effect, and though Metsu painted curtains sparingly, he has chosen to place his subject prominently in front of a closed curtain here. Her portrayal at first glance needs no other supporting commentary, unlike his other "niche" paintings which are adorned with details in the typical "Dou" manner. A closer look reveals an interesting bas-relief under the window, which appears to be a Metsu variation of Francois Duquesnoy's frieze of Children Playing with a Goat. Though its meaning is lost, it shows a clue (along with her dress) that this woman is someone connected to Metsu's circle and was possibly a model for other Leiden painters.

References

External links
A Negress, at a Window in the c.1942 Polesden Lacey catalog, on archive.org
The Great British Art Tour: a girl with a pearl earring, 14 April 2021 article in The Guardian

1660s paintings
Paintings by Gabriël Metsu
Black people in art
Collections of the National Trust
Genre paintings